Godamdar (also Romanized as Godāmdar and Gadāmdar; also known as Qadamdī) is a village in Zaboli Rural District, in the Central District of Mehrestan County, Sistan and Baluchestan Province, Iran. At the 2006 census, its population was 503, in 131 families.

References 

Populated places in Mehrestan County